The ECN Group operates in electronic data interchange, business process management and system integration. ECN provides all export and import messaging services to and from NZ Customs. ECN has over 3,500 customers.

ECN's head office is in Wellington, New Zealand; it also has offices in Auckland, Sydney and Manila. It is a wholly owned subsidiary of New Zealand Post.

References

External links
  ECN group web site

Service companies of New Zealand